Cales may refer to:

 Cales, an ancient city of Campania, Italy, on the Via Latina
 Cales (Bithynia), an emporium or trading place on the coast of ancient Bithynia
 Cales (river), a river of ancient Bithynia
 Cales, Dordogne, France
 Cales, Lot, France

See also
 Calès (disambiguation)
 Cale (disambiguation)